This is a list of state highway spur routes (spurs) in the U.S. state of Arkansas. The spurs are named after their parent highways, which leads to multiple designations of the same name in some cases. All spur routes are maintained by the Arkansas Department of Transportation (ArDOT).

Shields

Arkansas state highway spur routes are signed using standard state highway shield backgrounds. The number remains the same size and a "S" (for spur) is added in an almost-exponential format. Shield sizes remain, one-digit routes keep the  shields, while two-digit routes become . Three-digit routes are the same as the parent route with the "S" placed in the available corner space. The "Spur" banners are usually not used by ArDOT, which instead prefers to use only a direction banner.

State highway spurs

See also

References

 
 
 
 
 
 

State spur